Jangle pop is a subgenre of pop rock or college rock that emphasizes jangly guitars and 1960s-style pop melodies. The term originated from Bob Dylan's song "Mr. Tambourine Man", whose 1965 rendition by the Byrds became considered one of the genre's representative works. Since the 1960s, jangle pop has crossed numerous genres, including power pop, psychedelia, new wave, post-punk, indie rock, and lo-fi.

In the 1980s, the most prominent bands of early indie rock were jangle pop groups such as R.E.M., the Wedding Present, and the Smiths. In the early to mid 1980s, the term "jangle pop" emerged as a label for an American post-punk movement that recalled the sounds of "jangly" acts from the 1960s. Between 1983 and 1987, the description "jangle pop" was used to describe bands like R.E.M. and Let's Active as well as the Paisley Underground subgenre, which incorporated psychedelic influences.

Etymology

The term "jangle pop" was not used during the original movement of the 1960s, but was popularized later, during the 1980s, as a reference to the lyric "In the jingle jangle morning, I'll come following you" from the Byrds' 1965 rendition of Bob Dylan's "Mr. Tambourine Man", as well as the chiming sound of the 12-string Rickenbacker's upper-register strings.

History

The Everly Brothers and the Searchers laid the foundations for jangle pop in the late 1950s to mid 1960s; examples include "All I Have to Do Is Dream" (1958), and "Needles and Pins" (1964).. Even though many subsequent bands drew hugely from the Byrds, not every group were as folk rock sounding as the Byrds were.  From then and into the 1970s, jangle pop saw a crossover with other subgenres, including power pop artists like Raspberries and Big Star who blurred the line between the two styles, and folk rock artists such as Simon and Garfunkel.

1980s post-punk and new wave artists were influenced by the pioneering jangle pop groups of the 1960s and 1970s. In 1979, the Athens, Georgia group Pylon debuted with an "angular, propulsive jangle pop sound" that would influence fellow members of the Athens, Georgia music scene. An AllMusic summary of modern jangle pop describes it as a "pop-based format", but not mainstream, as the lyrics could often be "deliberately cryptic", and the sound "raw and amateurish" with a DIY production.

Between 1983 and 1987, "Southern-pop bands like R.E.M. and Let's Active" and a California-originated subgenre called "Paisley Underground" incorporated psychedelic influences. An article in Blogcritics magazine claims that besides R.E.M., the "... only other jangle-pop band to enjoy large sales in America were the Bangles, from Los Angeles. While better known for their glossy hits like 'Manic Monday', their first album and EP were organic, real jangle-pop efforts in a Byrds/Big Star vein, spiced with a dash of psychedelia on their debut."

Jangle pop influenced college rock during the early 1980s. In Austin, Texas, the term "New Sincerity" was loosely used for a similar group of bands, led by The Reivers, Wild Seeds and True Believers.

In the 1990's, with the arrival of grunge, jangle pop's popularity began to wane. This was evident with R.E.M., who swapped jangle for grunge on Monster, however, despite this decline in popularity, some grunge bands experimented with jangle pop elements. For instance, Alice In Chains and Stone Temple Pilots experimented with the genre on Jar of Flies (especially on No Excuses) and Tiny Music... Songs from the Vatican Gift Shop.

See also
List of jangle pop bands

References

 
1980s in music
1990s in music
American styles of music
British styles of music
American rock music genres
British rock music genres
1980s neologisms
Pop rock